The Stuttgart Surge are an American football team based in Stuttgart, Germany. They play in the European League of Football (ELF) as part of the league's South division. The team plays its home games at the Gazi Stadium which is currently the oldest sports stadium in Germany still in use.

Franchise history 
The Stuttgart franchise is one of the eight founding members of the European League of Football (ELF), established in 2020. Initially, the franchise was supposed to start as the Stuttgart Scorpions, adopting the name of Stuttgart's German Football League (GFL) team. Since the member's assembly of the Stuttgart Scorpions decided to disallow the use of the name, the team formed as Stuttgart Surge reviving the World League of American Football (WLAF) "Surge" franchise of the 1992 World Bowl champion Sacramento Surge. The World League of American Football was later renamed the NFL Europe. The label Surge was picked over the name Stallions in compliance of the former 1980s and 1990s American football team Stuttgart Stallions and determines the design of the new club logo and ensign. The franchise is operated by the American Football Club Stuttgart GmbH, whose general manager Timo Franke previously worked as gameday manager for the Stuttgart Scorpions. Martin Hanselmann, the former coach of Germany's national American football team was signed as head coach in 2021.

The team played their first game in the new league against the Barcelona Dragons (ELF) on June 19, 2021, with a 17–21 victory. In their week 2 loss to Frankfurt Galaxy starting Quarterback Jacob Wright was ejected for using a racially charged insult against an opponent for which he was ultimately cut from Stuttgart Surge and banned from playing for any ELF team for the ongoing 2021 season. The new Quarterback Aaron Ellis was presented ahead of the week 3 matchup against Berlin Thunder (ELF). After two consecutive losses during the end of the season, the team finished last in the South division and did not qualify for the playoffs.

The front office and owner structure changed significantly in preparation for the 2022 European League of Football season. Former general manager Timo Franke handed the office over to Suni Musa, but staying in the organisation as head of sales and sponsoring. On February 4, 2022, it was revealed that New England Patriots fullback and Stuttgart native Jakob Johnson will become co-owner of the franchise.

Season-by-season

Logos 
With the presentation of the new team name in 2021, the franchise unveiled two logos for their first season. The design of the major logo uses the form of the Stuttgart TV tower in the team colors yellow and blue with the tower shaft and the antenna depicting a stylized lightning bolt. The tower basket features the team name in white on a dark ground. The minor logo just shows a stylized lightning bolt in yellow pointing to the right and features optionally the team name or a multiangled line, both in a dark color.

Roster

Staff

References

External links
 Official website

American football teams in Germany
Sport in Stuttgart
 
European League of Football teams
2021 establishments in Germany
American football teams established in 2021